Joel-Peter Witkin (born September 13, 1939) is an American photographer who lives in Albuquerque, New Mexico. His work often deals with themes such as death, corpses (and sometimes dismembered portions thereof), often featuring ornately decorated photographic models, including people with dwarfism, transgender and intersex persons, as well as people living with a range of physical features which Witkin is often praised for presenting in poses which celebrate and honor their physiques in an elevated, artistic manner.
Witkin's complex tableaux often recall religious episodes or classical paintings.

Biography
Witkin was born to a Jewish father and Roman Catholic mother. His twin brother, Jerome Witkin, and son Kersen Witkin, are also painters. Witkin's parents divorced when he was young because they were unable to overcome their religious differences. He attended grammar school at Saint Cecelia's in Brooklyn and went on to Grover Cleveland High School. In 1961 Witkin enlisted in the United States Army with the intention of capturing war photography during the Vietnam war. However, due to scheduling conflicts, Witkin never saw combat in Vietnam. Witkin spent his military time at Fort Hood, Texas, and was mostly in charge of Public Information and classified photos. In 1967, he became the official photographer for City Walls Inc. He attended Cooper Union in New York, where he studied sculpture, attaining a Bachelor of Arts degree in 1974. Columbia University granted him a scholarship for graduate school, but his Master of Fine Arts degree is from the University of New Mexico in Albuquerque.

Influences and themes 
Witkin claims that his vision and sensibility spring from an episode he witnessed as a young child, an automobile accident in front of his house in which a little girl was decapitated.
 

 
He says his family's difficulties also influenced his work. His favorite artist is Giotto. His photographic techniques draw on early Daguerreotypes and on the work of E. J. Bellocq.
 
Those of Witkin's works which use corpses have had to be created in Mexico to get around restrictive US laws. Because of the transgressive nature of the contents of his images, his works have been labelled exploitative and have sometimes shocked public opinion.
 
His techniques include scratching the negative, bleaching or toning the print, and using a hands-in-the-chemicals printing technique. This experimentation began after seeing a 19th-century ambrotype of a woman and her ex-lover who had been scratched from the frame.
 
Joel-Peter Witkin's photograph "Sanitarium" inspired the final presentation of Alexander McQueen's Spring/Summer 2001 collection based on avian imagery, the walls of another box within the faux psychiatric ward collapsed to reveal a startling tableau vivant: a reclining, masked nude breathing through a tube and surrounded by fluttering moths.

Documentary 
In 2011, filming began on the feature-length documentary, Joel-Peter Witkin: An Objective Eye. The film, directed by Thomas Marino, examines Witkin's life and photographs. Along with interviews with Witkin, the film includes interviews from gallery owners, artists, photographers, and scholars who share insight into the impact of Witkin's work and influence on modern culture. The film was released in 2013. It will be part of the permanent collections at the Bibliothèque nationale de France in Paris, and the Biblioteca Nacional de Chile in Santiago, Chile.

Joel-Peter Witkin: An Objective Eye was first publicly shown in Santiago, Chile at the Biblioteca Nacional de Chile in 2013, as part of the opening of the exhibition, Vanitas: Joel-Peter Witkin en Chile.

In 2017, a documentary about him and his brother, Jerome Witkin, was made by Trisha Ziff, entitled Witkin and Witkin.

Publications
Joel-Peter Witkin, A Retrospective (1995)
Harms Way (1994)
Joel-Peter Witkin, Twelve Photographs in Gravure (1994)
Gods of Heaven and Earth (1989)

Exhibitions

 1959: Group show at the Museum of Modern Art, NYC
 1981: Group show at San Francisco Museum of Modern Art
 1983: Exhibited in Kansas City Art Institute. Exhibited in Stedelijk Mus, Amsterdam.
 1985: Exhibited in San Francisco Museum of Modern Art. Group show at the Whitney Biennial
 1986: Exhibited in Brooklyn Museum. Group show at Palis de Tokyo, Paris
 1988: Exhibited in Centro de Arte Reina Sofia Museum, Madrid.
 1989: Exhibited in Palais de Tokyo, Paris.
 1991: Exhibited in Museum Of Modern Art Haifa, Israel
 1995: Exhibited in Guggenheim Museum, NYC. Exhibited in II Castello de Rivoli Museum., Turin
 1996: Exhibited in Rencontres de la Photograpie, Arles, France. Group show at La Photographie Contemporaine en France
 1997: Group show at Hayward Gallery, London
 1998: Exhibited in Museum of Fine Arts, Santa Fe. Group show at Strasbourg Museum of Modern and Contemporary Art
 1999: Group show at The Louvre, Paris
 2000: Group show at Musée Bourdelle, Paris. Group show at The High Mus. Art, Ga.,
 2002: Group show at National Gallery of Canada. Group show at The Israel Museum, Jerusalem. Group show at The Whitney Museum, NYC
 2004: Group show at National Gallery of Canada, Ottawa.
 2005: Exhibited in Moscow House of Photography. Group show at Guggenheim, Bilbao. Group show at Museum of Contemporary Photography, Chicago
 2007: Exhibited in The Invisible Landscape, National Gallery of Canada
 2010: Exhibited in Bodies, Fotografiska Museum, Stockholm,
 2012: Exhibited in Heaven or Hell, Bibliothèque nationale de France, Paris.
 2013: Exhibited in "Vanitas: Joel-Peter Witkin en Chile", Biblioteca Nacional de Chile, Santiago. Joel-Peter Witkin: An Objective Eye documentary premiered at the opening of this exhibition.

Notes

External links 
 Joel-Peter Witkin: Tribute to a Genius
 Photographs by Witkin
 More photographs by Witkin
 
 21st Editions The Journal of Joel-Peter Witkin
 transgressive Art essay
 Bruce Silverstein Gallery
 Joel-Peter Witkin: An Objective Eye
 

 

1939 births
Living people
Artists from New York City
Photographers from New York (state)
Jewish American artists
Nude photography
Obscenity controversies in photography
Censorship in the arts
Artists from Albuquerque, New Mexico
People from Brooklyn
Columbia University alumni
Cooper Union alumni
University of New Mexico alumni
20th-century American photographers
21st-century American photographers
Identical twins